Erethizontinae is a subfamily of the New World porcupine family Erethizontidae, and includes all species of the family with the exception of the bristle-spined rat, Chaetomys subspinosus, which is classified in its own subfamily, Chaetomyinae.

References 

 
Taxa named by Charles Lucien Bonaparte